Søren Bjerg (born February 21, 1996), better known as Bjergsen, is a Danish professional League of Legends player for 100 Thieves. He previously played for Team Liquid and Team SoloMid, spending seven years as the starting mid laner for the latter, and one year as head coach for their League of Legends Championship Series (LCS) team from 2014-2021.

Personal life 
Bjerg was born on February 21, 1996, in Denmark. He grew up in Mejdal, Holstebro with his two brothers. Prior to League of Legends, Bjerg played several games casually, including Counter Strike Global Offensive, World of Warcraft, Hearthstone, and Diablo 2.

Career 
Bjerg joined professional League of Legends in 2013 as a member of the Copenhagen Wolves in the European League of Legends Championship Series. Due to age restrictions put in place by Riot Games, Bjerg was unable to play with the Copenhagen Wolves until Week 3. For the first two weeks, he was temporarily replaced by the team's substitute player, . After he turned 17 years old on February 21, he joined the main lineup and played in the remaining matches. After finding success with CW, his team was acquired by and re-branded as Ninjas in Pyjamas (NiP) for the Summer Split of the EU LCS.

On November 2, 2013, Bjerg left NiP to move to North America and joined Team SoloMid as their mid laner. He was the second player to cross over from the EU to NA LCS, after Edward left Gambit Gaming to join Team Curse during Season 3. On January 23, 2014, Riot Games announced that Bjerg violated the LCS rules by approaching and encouraging a contracted LCS player to leave his position at Lemondogs. He admitted the violation and was fined $2,000. In the Spring Split, Bjerg and TSM finished second place in the regular season with a 22–6 record, and Bjergsen won the Most Valuable Player award in his first split in North America. They were placed into the semi–finals, where they defeated Counter Logic Gaming 2–0 before falling 3–0 to Cloud9 in the finals. In Summer, Team SoloMid ended at 16–12, which was good enough for a third place seeding in the playoffs. TSM faced Dignitas in the first round, and won 3–1, before facing defeating LMQ in a close 3–2 series to make their fourth consecutive finals appearance, and their third against Cloud9. This time, Team SoloMid was able to overcome the reigning champions, and Bjerg won his first LCS Championship.

In 2015 Spring, Bjerg once again won the MVP Award, leading his team to a 13–5 record; first place in the league. In playoffs, Team SoloMid defeated Team Impulse 3–1 in the Semifinals, before once again meeting Cloud9 in the title match. TSM defeated C9 3–1, and won their third LCS title, and Bjerg's second. In the Summer Split, TSM finished 5th, with a record of 11–7, but once again made the run to finals, defeating Gravity Gaming and Team Liquid both with a score of 3–1. In the finals, they faced Counter Logic Gaming, and were swept 3–0. Despite losing the Summer Finals, TSM still qualified for the 2015 League of Legends World Championship. At Worlds, Team SoloMid were drawn into Group D, alongside Korea's KT Rolster, Europe's Origen, and China's LGD Gaming. TSM came last in their group with a record of 1–5, eliminating them in the group stage.

In 2016, Team SoloMid started the Spring Split slow, ending in sixth place, with a 9–9 record, barely qualifying for playoffs. However once the knockout stage arrived, TSM defeated Cloud9 and Immortals, 3–1, and 3–0 respectively, to face Counter Logic Gaming in a rematch of last year. Once again, TSM was defeated, this time with a score of 3–2. In Summer, Team SoloMid finished with a record of 17–1, dropping only a single game to Immortals, and Bjerg won his third MVP. The team faced Counter Logic Gaming in the playoffs once again, but this time in the Semifinals, and this time, TSM swept the series 3–0 and went on to face Cloud9 in the finals, where they would win 3–1. With the victory, Bjerg earned his third World Championship appearance, this time, as North America's first seed. At the competition, Team SoloMid was drawn into group D, with Korea's Samsung Galaxy, China's Royal Never Give Up, and Europe's Splyce. They finished third in their group with a 3–3 record, and were once again eliminated in the Group stage.

For the 2017 season, TSM finished Spring with a record of 15-3 as the second seed. Bjerg was awarded First Team All–Pro, but missed out on the MVP. In playoffs, TSM defeated FlyQuest 3–0 before facing Cloud9 in the finals. TSM won 3-2, and qualified for the 2017 Mid–Season Invitational. At MSI, Team SoloMid finished with a 4–6 record, placing fifth out of six teams. For the Summer Split, Bjerg and Team SoloMid once again finished first in the regular season, with a 14–4 record. Bjerg was awarded his fourth MVP, and in playoffs, TSM defeated Dignitas 3–1 before facing a new challenger, Immortals, in the finals. TSM won 3-1 and once again earned the first seed for the 2017 World Championships. Team SoloMid were placed into Group D, alongside China's Team WE, Europe's Misfits and Taiwan's Flash Wolves, but despite not having a Korean team in their group, TSM were still unable to advance, going 3-3 to finish third.

In 2018 Spring, Team SoloMid achieved an 11-7 record in the regular season, seeding third for playoffs. Bjerg was voted First Team All–Pro, but in playoffs, TSM were upset by the sixth seed, the newly formed Clutch Gaming and for the first time in their history, Team SoloMid were eliminated before finals. For Summer, TSM finished fifth with a 10-8 record, and faced Echo Fox in the quarterfinals, where they won 3-1, before losing to Cloud9 in the semifinals. Due to their fifth and third place finishes, respectively, Team SoloMid did not automatically qualify for Worlds 2018 and were instead placed into the Regional Gauntlet as the 2nd seed, with the winner claiming the third and final spot representing North America. In a rematch with Echo Fox, Team SoloMid swept the series 3–0, before being swept themselves by Cloud9, eliminating them. For the first time in his LCS career, Bjerg did not attend the World Championship.

After a disappointing 2018 season, Team SoloMid went 13–5 in 2019 Spring, good for third place. Bjerg took home another First Team All–Pro, and in playoffs they defeated Echo Fox 3–1, then reverse swept Cloud9 3–2 to return to the finals vs Team Liquid, where they were, in turn, reverse swept. In the Summer Split, TSM finished fifth, with a 10–8 record, but lost their first playoff game 3–1 to Clutch. Once again, the Regional Gauntlet was the team's last chance to save their season, but TSM was defeated 3–2 by Clutch gaming, and for the second straight year, Bjerg and Team SoloMid failed to qualify for the World Championship.

In the Spring Split, TSM began their season by going 9–9, and in playoffs, defeated 100 Thieves 3–2 before falling to FlyQuest 2–3 and were once again eliminated early. In Summer however, they finished fourth, at 12–6, and Bjerg once again took home All Pro Honors, being voted to the First–Team. TSM faced Golden Guardians in the first round, and swept 3–0. However due to the new format, they were given another change in the losers bracket. There, TSM went on a run, defeating Dignitas, Golden Guardians, Cloud9, Team Liquid, and finally FlyQuest to win the 2020 Summer Split. Bjerg claimed his 6th LCS Championship Title, tying him for second all time, and earning TSM a spot at Worlds, however they failed to win a single game, going 0–6 and finishing last among all teams in the group stage.

In October 2020, after a seven–year career with Team SoloMid, Bjerg retired from professional play and transitioned to the head–coach position for TSM. Bjerg dismissed speculation that his retirement was prompted by TSM's disappointing performance at the 2020 Worlds, saying that he had been planning it for some time. On November 21, TSM signed Tristan "PowerOfEvil" Schrage from FlyQuest to replace Bjerg in the midlane. This new TSM squad, with Bjerg as their coach, finished second in Spring and first in Summer, but despite regular season success, Team SoloMid did not succeed in playoffs, and placed fifth in Lock-In, third in the Mid-Season Showdown, and fourth in Summer, losing to Cloud9, Team Liquid, and Cloud9, respectively. As a result, Bjerg's team did not attend Worlds.

In September 2021, Bjerg announced a desire to resume a player role, and a one month later, he rejected a contract renewal offer from TSM, and announced he would be leaving the team. On November 24, 2021, Bjerg joined Team Liquid.

Bjerg made his debut with his new team in the 2022 Lock–In, which Team Liquid won, defeating Evil Geniuses 3–0. Bjerg earned player of the series in the final match.

Tournament results

2012

2014

2015

2016

2017

2018

2019

2020

References

External links 
 

1996 births
Living people
Danish esports players
League of Legends mid lane players
Team SoloMid players
Copenhagen Wolves players
Ninjas in Pyjamas players
Team LDLC.com players
Red Bull
Twitch (service) streamers
League of Legends coaches